American football was a demonstration sport at the 1932 Summer Olympics in Los Angeles. On the evening of August 8, 1932, seniors from three Western universities (Cal, Stanford, and USC) were matched against those from the East Coast's "Big Three" (Harvard, Yale, and Princeton). In front of 60,000 spectators at the Los Angeles Memorial Coliseum, the West team won by a score of 7–6.  All-American Gaius "Gus" Shaver from USC was the captain of the West team and the game's leading rusher with 145 yards on 16 attempts.  The football game at the 1932 Summer Olympics, combined with a similar demonstration game at 1933 World's Fair, led to the College All-Star Game which was an important factor in the growth of professional football in the United States.

Origins
The game was originally proposed by organizers as an "intersectional" match-up between the defending national champions, University of Southern California, on the West Coast and East Coast stalwarts, Yale University. USC coach/former Yale coach Howard Jones delivered a confidential proposal from the President of the Organizing Committee for the 1932 Summer Olympics, William May Garland, to the President of Yale University, James Rowland Angell, inviting Yale to play in the game. On the heels of the 1929 Carnegie Report which decried various aspects of professionalism within college football, Angell reluctantly turned down the invitation. Although unable to secure a USC/Yale match-up and determined that football be a demonstration sport, the organizers "settled" on a game consisting of all-stars who would have graduated by the Olympic games.

Game summary

The game was scoreless until early in the fourth quarter. When a field goal attempt by the East fell short, Shaver and another player from the West muffed the ball in an attempt to pick it up. According to various reports, Burton Strange from the East either carried the loose ball across the goal line or simply fell on it in the end zone to give his team a 6–0 lead. Eddie Mays' extra point kick was blocked. With three minutes left in the game, Shaver scored over the right tackle to tie the game at 6–6, and Ed Kirwan's conversion put the West in the lead for good.

Participants

Like the other Olympic athletes, players for both teams lived in the Olympic Village. The starters for the West team consisted of six USC players, star halfback Rudy Rintala and two others from Stanford, and two from California. The starting line-up for the East team was four players from Harvard and seven from Yale. A number of College Football Hall of Famers elected not to play in the game. All-American  Albie Booth of Yale as well as Erny Pinckert and All-American Johnny Baker of USC decided not to play when offered paying jobs in Hollywood. Barry Wood of Harvard, another All-American, was also selected to play in the demonstration, however, he reportedly declined in order to concentrate on his studies.

Rosters

West

East

See also
American football at the Summer Olympics

Notes

References

1932 in American football
History of American football
Olympics 1932
Discontinued sports at the Summer Olympics
Olympic demonstration sports
Men's events at the 1932 Summer Olympics